Lovely Day is a Philippine television informative show broadcast by GMA Network. Hosted by Love Añover, it premiered on April 3, 2004. The show concluded on May 23, 2009 with a total of 263 episodes.

Hosts

 Love Añover
 Jacob Raterta
 Bea Binene
 Gabriel Roxas
 Christian Esteban
 BJ Forbes

Accolades

Ratings
According to AGB Nielsen Philippines' Mega Manila household television ratings, the final episode of Lovely Day scored a 9.1% rating.

References

External links
 

2004 Philippine television series debuts
2009 Philippine television series endings
Filipino-language television shows
GMA Network original programming
GMA Integrated News and Public Affairs shows
Philippine television shows